Adriano Henry Mastrangelo (February 8, 1919 – April 9, 1999) is a former Republican member of the Pennsylvania House of Representatives.

References

Republican Party members of the Pennsylvania House of Representatives
1999 deaths
1919 births
20th-century American politicians